The 1917–18 Dartmouth men's ice hockey season was the 13th season of play for the program.

Season
Unlike most programs, Dartmouth continued to field a team throughout the duration of World War I. The team did, however, suffer as a result of the war, with many potential players not attending college for the 1917–18 term. Team captain John Murphy also served as the team's coach, though this was in an unofficial capacity as he wasn't employed by the university.

Note: Dartmouth College did not possess a moniker for its athletic teams until the 1920s, however, the university had adopted 'Dartmouth Green' as its school color in 1866.

Roster

Standings

Schedule and Results

|-
!colspan=12 style=";" | Regular Season

References

Dartmouth Big Green men's ice hockey seasons
Dartmouth
Dartmouth
Dartmouth
Dartmouth